Changchien is a Chinese-language surname. It originated near Kaohsiung as a combination of the surnames Zhang and Jian from a uxorilocal, matrilocal residence marriage custom in Fujian, China, and now exists in Taiwan and diaspora communities. In 2019 it was reported to be the most-common two syllable surname in Taiwan, surpassing even Ouyang, which is the most common in the mainland. The data suggest that it is shared by 9,059 people, or 0.09% of the population.

Notable people
 Louis Ozawa Changchien, American actor of Taiwanese and Japanese descent, known for The Bourne Legacy

References

Taiwanese culture
Individual Chinese surnames